Jay Howard (born 16 February 1981) is a British professional race car driver who competes in the IndyCar Series and Indianapolis 500 and resides in Indianapolis, Indiana. Howard was the 2005 US Formula Ford Zetec champion (now known as the Cooper Tires USF2000 Championship) and moved up to the Indy Lights series, where he captured two wins on his way to the 2006 championship for Sam Schmidt Motorsports in his rookie season. He qualified for his first Indianapolis 500 in 2011.

Career
Howard was born in Basildon, England.

Indy Pro Series (2006–07)
In 2006, Howard competed in the Indy Pro Series for Sam Schmidt Motorsports, winning the series championship in his rookie season over Jonathan Klein and Wade Cunningham. Howard earned two victories (Nashville and Kentucky) and seven total podium finishes. He made three starts for SpeedWorks at the beginning of the 2007 season, but was inactive for the rest of the year.

IndyCar Series (2008)

Roth Racing announced on 26 November 2007 that they had signed Howard to drive their second car for the 2008 IndyCar Series season.

Howard was hired on merit/talent and did not bring sponsorship to the team.  The team was presented with a sponsorship opportunity with another driver and Howard was replaced in the No. 24 Roth Racing entry by John Andretti for the 2008 Indianapolis 500. This was originally announced as a one–race arrangement, meaning Howard would be back for the Milwaukee race. However, on 30 May, it was announced that Andretti would continue in the No. 24 car in the Milwaukee Mile and Texas Motor Speedway races. Andretti also drove in the next two races at the Iowa Speedway and Richmond International Raceway, but Howard returned to the car for the Watkins Glen International road course race. It would be Howard's last race with the team, as it contracted to a single car driven by team owner Marty Roth for the rest of the season.

Firestone Indy Lights (2009)

Howard began the 2009 Indy Lights season – the new name for the Indy Pro Series – for the rookie outfit Team PBIR. He competed in five races, before being replaced by paying drivers Pablo Donoso and Richard Philippe for the remainder of the season.

Return to the IndyCar Series (2010–18)

2010 season
While Howard was announced in late 2009 with SFR for four events – Indianapolis Motor Speedway, Texas Motor Speedway, Chicagoland Speedway, Mid-Ohio Sports Car Course – on 1 March 2010, SFR announced that they would add the Kansas Speedway event to Howard's campaign. On 14 April, Howard joined team owner Fisher when he was the first entrant for the 2010 Indianapolis 500, while celebrating the 100th anniversary of English drivers competing at the legendary Indianapolis Motor Speedway.

On 21 April, Howard unveiled the 2010 paint scheme for his No. 66 Service Central entry at Kansas Speedway during a private test. On 23 May, Howard had qualified for the 94th running of the Indianapolis 500.  With just minutes left before the gun would fire to signal the 33-car field, Howard's entry was withdrawn due to pressure from next in queue, veteran driver Paul Tracy.  Howard failed to show sufficient speed to qualify and missed the race.  On 28 August, Howard competed in his last race with SFR, fulfilling his contract with the team.

On 10 October, Howard won the RoboPong 200 all-star kart race at the New Castle Motorsports Park along with teammate Bill McLaughlin Jr., beating such notable drivers as Will Power and Graham Rahal, among others.

2011 season
Howard noted in an interview on 14 October 2010, on Trackside with Curt Cavin and Kevin Lee on 1070 The Fan Indianapolis, that he would in no way return to SFR after the year they had.  He also noted that he has his 2011 Indianapolis 500 program solidified and the team would be announced soon. Howard signed a deal with Rahal Letterman Lanigan Racing in association with Sam Schmidt Motorsports to race in the 2011 Indianapolis 500 and the twin races at Texas Motor Speedway. Howard successfully qualified for the Indy 500 on pole day in the 20th position. He crashed out of the race after completing 60 laps and was credited with 30th place. Two weeks later, he finished 15th and 20th in the twin races at Texas Motor Speedway.

2012 season
Howard was announced on 23 April 2012 as the driver of a Mike Shank Racing entry, which was filed for the 96th running of the Indianapolis 500. On 2 May 2012, MSR Indy announced they had relieved Howard of his duties to the team, after an engine deal had not materialised for the team, leaving the Brit open to pursue other options.

2017 season
After a four-year absence from the Verizon IndyCar Series, Howard made his return to the series during the 101st running of the Indy 500 in a car financed by Tony Stewart and Sam Schmidt.

2018 season
Jay returned to Sam Schmidt Motorsports and competed in the 2018 Indy 500 for the second consecutive time in the race and for the team.

Motorsports Driver Development (MDD)
In 2012, Howard founded Jay Howard's Motorsports Driver Development (MDD) in hopes of creating a unique program capable of taking drivers from karts to cars and then up the motorsports ladder.

Karts

In the karting field, Howard has used his experience from the British Karting Championship, Indy Lights, and IndyCar to coach drivers of all ages. Initially, Howard focused only on drivers that already competing at the national level of karting; more recently, however, he has begun working with drivers at a club level, primarily at NOLA Motorsports Park. In the short time of running MDD, Howard has already coached drivers to two national championships in 2016, when Braden Eves won the World Karting Championship in Italian American Motor Engineering X-30 Senior and Yamaha Senior. MDD also claims multiple wins in the SuperKarts! USA Pro Tour as well as several wins in the United States Pro Kart Series.

In January 2017, Howard began running the "MDD Sprint Kart Championship" series at NOLA Motorsports park.

Formula 4 (U.S.)

In 2017, Howard entered 4 cars into the second year of the FIA Formula 4 United States Championship under the umbrella of MDD. Since the start of the season, the rookie team has found tremendous success. MDD obtained their highest finish during the second round of the championship, when rookie driver Braden Eves was able to obtain second at Indianapolis Motor Speedway after only one day in the car. Eves is set to race again in the final round of the championship at Circuit of the Americas in October.

Since the first round of the F4 United States Championship, Howard has had a total of 8 drivers compete in the series. Currently, Howard is working on growing his F4 Program with the hopes of advancing some of his prominent kart racers to the F4 Championship in 2018.

Media work
In a national promotion with MTV and American Family Insurance, Howard served as a driver coach for music-obsessed teen Lauren Goodell during the fall of 2009.  Commercials were filmed on 12 and 13 October in Nebraska at Mid-America Motorplex. The commercials were first aired during MTV's Real World/Road Rules Challenge on 28 October 2009, and ran for four weeks during MTV's flagship program. A fifth installment was scheduled for 4 December 2009 during the mtvU Woodie Awards, which were filmed on 18 October in New York City.

Howard is represented by BRANDed Management agency, founded by Klint Briney.

Personal life
Howard married his longtime girlfriend Courtney Nicoson on Saturday, 29 October 2011 in a private ceremony in Indianapolis, Indiana. Jay & Courtney live in Carmel, Ind., with their only child, a son, Hudson. Howard was the subject of the cover story for the Carmel Monthly magazazine's May 2021 issue.

Motorsports career results

American open-wheel racing results
(key) (Races in bold indicate pole position)

Indy Lights

IndyCar Series

* Season still in progress.
 1 Run on same day.
 2 Non-points-paying, exhibition race.
 3 Race cancelled due to death of Dan Wheldon.

Indianapolis 500

References

External links

IndyCar Driver Page

1981 births
English racing drivers
British Formula Renault 2.0 drivers
Indy Lights champions
Indy Lights drivers
IndyCar Series drivers
Living people
Sportspeople from Basildon
Toyota Racing Series drivers
Indianapolis 500 drivers
Indy Pro 2000 Championship drivers
U.S. F2000 National Championship drivers
Motorsport team owners
Sarah Fisher Racing drivers
Arrow McLaren SP drivers
Rahal Letterman Lanigan Racing drivers
AFS Racing drivers